Westfield is a village in Marquette County, Wisconsin, United States. The population was 1,254 at the 2010 census. The village is located mostly within the Town of Westfield. A small portion extends east into the adjacent Town of Harris. The Marquette County fairgrounds is located within the village limits on the south side.

History
The village was originally settled and laid out by Hungarian American immigrant Agoston Haraszthy.  It was first named Széptáj—Hungarian for "beautiful landscape"—and was later renamed Haraszthy, in honor of the village founder.  In 1849, the Legislature renamed the village Westfield.

Geography

Demographics

2010 census
As of the census of 2010, there were 1,254 people, 523 households, and 321 families living in the village. The racial makeup of the village was 96.4% White, 0.3% African American, 0.4% Native American, 0.8% Asian, 0.9% from other races, and 1.2% from two or more races. Hispanic or Latino of any race were 3.7% of the population.

There were 523 households, of which 34.0% had children under the age of 18 living with them, 42.4% were married couples living together, 12.8% had a female householder with no husband present, 6.1% had a male householder with no wife present, and 38.6% were non-families. 32.7% of all households were made up of individuals, and 17.7% had someone living alone who was 65 years of age or older. The average household size was 2.40 and the average family size was 3.03.

The median age in the village was 36.8 years. 27.4% of residents were under the age of 18; 8.9% were between the ages of 18 and 24; 24.2% were from 25 to 44; 23.8% were from 45 to 64; and 15.7% were 65 years of age or older. The gender makeup of the village was 48.2% male and 51.8% female.

2000 census
As of the census of 2000, there were 1,217 people, 504 households, and 325 families living in the village.  The population density was 859.1 people per square mile (330.9/km2). There were 553 housing units at an average density of 390.4 per square mile (150.4/km2). The racial makeup of the village was 97.45% White, 0.16% Black or African American, 0.41% Native American, 0.25% Asian, 0.08% from other races, and 1.64% from two or more races. 3.53% of the population were Hispanic or Latino of any race.

There were 504 households, out of which 34.5% had children under the age of 18 living with them, 46.6% were married couples living together, 13.3% had a female householder with no husband present, and 35.5% were non-families. 32.1% of all households were made up of individuals, and 18.3% had someone living alone who was 65 years of age or older.  The average household size was 2.38 and the average family size was 2.96.

In the village, the population was spread out, with 27.7% under the age of 18, 8.8% from 18 to 24, 26.7% from 25 to 44, 20.0% from 45 to 64, and 16.8% who were 65 years of age or older. The median age was 36 years. For every 100 females, there were 94.1 males. For every 100 females age 18 and over, there were 83.0 males.

The median income for a household in the village was $30,341, and the median income for a family was $34,306. Males had a median income of $30,758 versus $22,938 for females. The per capita income for the village was $17,318. About 7.3% of families and 9.5% of the population were below the poverty line, including 10.2% of those under age 18 and 15.3% of those age 65 or over.

Education
Westfield is part of to the School District of Westfield. There are three elementary schools, one middle school, and one high school in the district.

Notable people
Robert M. Long, Wisconsin State Representative
Levi E. Pond, Wisconsin State Senator
Greg Dean Schmitz, film journalist (Yahoo! Movies, Rotten Tomatoes)

References

External links

Village of Westfield Official Site
Westfield, Wisconsin Chamber of Commerce
Sanborn fire insurance maps: 1894 1901 1914

Villages in Marquette County, Wisconsin
Villages in Wisconsin
Westfield, Marquette County, Wisconsin